Mali Air Express was an airline based in Bamako, Mali. Its main base was Senou International Airport.

Former fleet 

The Mali Air Express fleet included the following aircraft (at April 2019):

References

External links
Mali Air Express Fleet

Defunct airlines of Mali
Airlines established in 2005
Companies based in Bamako
2005 establishments in Africa